The 1984–85 Mercer Bears men's basketball team represented Mercer University during the 1984–85 NCAA Division I men's basketball season. The Bears, led by head coach Bill Bibb, played their home games at Hawkins Arena on the university's Macon, Georgia campus and were members of the Atlantic Sun Conference. They finished the season 22–9, 10–4 in A-Sun play to finish second in the regular season standings. They won the TAAC tournament to earn the conferences automatic bid to the NCAA tournament. In the NCAA Tournament, they were beaten by No. 2 seed Georgia Tech in the opening round.

Roster

Schedule and results

 
|-
!colspan=9 style=| Regular season

|-
!colspan=9 style=| TAAC tournament

|-
!colspan=9 style=| NCAA tournament

References

Mercer Bears men's basketball seasons
Mercer
Mercer
Mercer Bears
Mercer Bears